Lobet Gott in seinen Reichen, BWV 11 ("Praise God in his kingdom")
 (Richard Allen) "Reichen" Lehmkuhl (born 1973), an American reality show winner, model
 
 Place names
 German name of Rychlik, Lubusz Voivodeship
 German name of Rychnów, Opole Voivodeship

German words and phrases
German exonyms
German-language surnames